Isaac Bloom (1748 – April 26, 1803) was an American politician and a United States representative from New York.

Biography
Bloom was born in Jamaica in the Province of New York.

Career
Bloom later moved to Clinton, Dutchess County, New York, and was a captain of minutemen of the Charlotte precinct in Dutchess County in 1775. He was a merchant in 1784, and from 1788 to 1792 was a member of the New York State Assembly.

A delegate to the New York state convention in 1801, Bloom was also a member of the New York State Senate from 1800 to 1802. He was elected as a Democratic-Republican as a U. S. Representative for the sixth district of New York to the 8th United States Congress, but died before Congress met. The office was his from March 4, 1803, until his death on April 26, 1803.

Death
Bloom died in Poughkeepsie, New York. Dutchess County, New York, on April 26, 1803 (age about 56 years). He is interred at Pittsbury Presbyterian Churchyard, Washington Hollow, New York.

See also
 List of United States Congress members who died in office (1790–1899)

References

External links
The Political Graveyard

1747 births
1803 deaths
People from Jamaica, Queens
Members of the New York State Assembly
New York (state) state senators
Democratic-Republican Party members of the United States House of Representatives from New York (state)